The Beaver was a steam tugboat, built in Scotland, and launched on August 3, 1886, for the Brisbane Tug & Steam Ship Company of Brisbane, Australia.  She subsequently had at least three owners.  In 1948 she was converted to a barge.

References

Ships built in Scotland
1886 ships
Tugboats of Australia